This is a list of all the seasons played by Huddersfield Town Association Football Club in English football from 1908, when the club was formed.

Seasons

32 seasons in Level 1 of English football league system
42 seasons in Level 2 of English football league system
22 seasons in Level 3 of English football league system
6 seasons in Level 4 of English football league system

Key

Pld = Matches played
W = Matches won
D = Matches drawn
L = Matches lost
GF = Goals for
GA = Goals against
Pts = Points
Pos = Final position

NEL = North Eastern League
ML = Midland Football League
Div 1 = Football League First Division
Div 2 = Football League Second Division
Div 3 = Football League Third Division
Div 4 = Football League Fourth Division
Prem = Premier League
Champ = EFL Championship
Lge 1 = EFL League One

4QR = 4th Qualifying Round
PR = Preliminary Round
R1 = Round 1
R2 = Round 2
R3 = Round 3
R4 = Round 4
R5 = Round 5
QF = Quarter-finals
NQF = Northern Quarter-finals
SF = Semi-finals
NSF = Northern Semi-finals
NF = Northern Final
R/U = Runners-up
W = Winners

Notes

References

Seasons
 
Huddersfield Town F.C.